Randy Ireland (born April 5, 1957) is a Canadian former professional ice hockey goaltender. He played two games in the National Hockey League with the Buffalo Sabres during the 1978–79 season. The rest of his career, which lasted from 1977 to 1983, was spent in various minor leagues.

Playing career
Born in Rosetown, Saskatchewan and raised in Biggar, Saskatchewan, Ireland played junior with the Saskatoon Blades of the Western Canada Hockey League from 1973 to 1976, then one final season with the Portland Winterhawks. He was selected in the fourth round, 60th overall by the Chicago Black Hawks in the 1977 NHL Amateur Draft. However he re-entered the draft in 1978 and was selected by the Buffalo Sabres in the fifth round, 82nd overall. He turned professional in 1977, and played in different minor leagues until 1983. His lone National Hockey League experience coming in two games with the Sabres during the 1978–79 season; he played a total of 30 minutes between the two games.

Career statistics

Regular season and playoffs

External links
 
 Randy Ireland @ hockeygoalies.org

1957 births
Living people
Baltimore Clippers (1979–81) players
Buffalo Sabres draft picks
Buffalo Sabres players
Canadian ice hockey goaltenders
Chicago Blackhawks draft picks
Estevan Bruins players
Flint Generals (IHL) players
Hershey Bears players
Ice hockey people from Saskatchewan
Mohawk Valley Stars players
Oklahoma City Stars players
People from Biggar, Saskatchewan
People from Rosetown
Portland Winterhawks players
Richmond Rifles players
Rochester Americans players
Saskatoon Blades players